Sodpur railway station is a Kolkata Suburban Railway station in the town of Sodepur. It serves the local areas of Sodepur in North 24 Parganas district, West Bengal, India.

History
The Sealdah–Kusthia line of the Eastern Bengal Railway was opened to railway traffic in the year 1862. Eastern Bengal Railway used to work only on the eastern side of the Hooghly River.

Station complex
The platform is not very well sheltered. It has many facilities including water and sanitation. It is well connected to the BT Road. But there is a proper approach road to this station.

Electrification
The Sealdah–Ranaghat sector was electrified in 1963–65.

References

External links

 

Sealdah railway division
Railway stations in North 24 Parganas district
Transport in Kolkata
Kolkata Suburban Railway stations